In 2015, the foremost athletics event was the 2015 World Championships in Athletics in Beijing. The two other major global level competitions in 2015 are the World Cross Country Championships and the IAAF World Relays.

The 2015 season marked the introduction of athletics at the European Games. However, this will not be a major continental event for athletics in the style of the Asian Games, as only the lower tier of the European Team Championships will be contested at the games. Major outdoor continental events will be held for the Americas (Pan American Games), Africa (All-Africa Games), Asia (2015 Asian Athletics Championships) and Oceania (Oceania Athletics Championships).

The Asian Youth Athletics Championships will be inaugurated this year.

World records

Indoor

Outdoor

Season's bests

Awards

Men

Women

Major events

World athletics championships
 March 28: 2015 IAAF World Cross Country Championships in  Guiyang

  won both the gold and overall medal tallies.
 May 2 & 3: 2015 IAAF World Relays in  Nassau
 Men's 4 × 100 m Relay winners:  (Mike Rodgers, Justin Gatlin, Tyson Gay, Ryan Bailey)
 Men's 4 × 200 m Relay winners:  (Nickel Ashmeade, Rasheed Dwyer, Jason Livermore, Warren Weir)
 Men's 4 × 400 m Relay winners:  (David Verburg, Tony McQuay, Jeremy Wariner, LaShawn Merritt)
 Men's 4 × 800 m Relay winners:  (Duane Solomon, Erik Sowinski, Casimir Loxsom, Robby Andrews)
 Men's Distance Medley Relay winners:  (Kyle Merber, Brycen Spratling, Brandon Johnson, Ben Blankenship) (World Record)
 Women's 4 × 100 m Relay winners:  (Simone Facey, Kerron Stewart, Schillonie Calvert, Veronica Campbell-Brown)
 Women's 4 × 200 m Relay winners:  (Blessing Okagbare, Regina George, Dominique Duncan, Christy Udoh)
 Women's 4 × 400 m Relay winners:  (Phyllis Francis, Natasha Hastings, Sanya Richards-Ross, Francena McCorory)
 Women's 4 × 800 m Relay winners:  (Chanelle Price, Maggie Vessey, Molly Beckwith-Ludlow, Alysia Montaño)
 Women's Distance Medley Relay winners:  (Treniere Moser, Sanya Richards-Ross, Ajee' Wilson, Shannon Rowbury) (World Record)
 July 15 – 19: 2015 World Youth Championships in Athletics in  Cali

 The  won both the gold and overall medal tallies.
 August 6 – 18: 2015 World Masters Athletics Championships in  Lyon
 August 22 – 30: 2015 World Championships in Athletics in  Beijing
  and  won 7 gold medals each. The  won the overall medal tally.
 October 22 – 31: 2015 IPC Athletics World Championships in  Doha
 Note: The 2015 IPC marathon events was hosted in London, in conjunction with the 2015 London Marathon, on April 26.

  won both the gold and overall medal tallies.

Regional athletics championships
 February 21 & 22: 2015 NACAC Cross Country Championships in  Barranquilla
 Senior Men's winner:  Maksim Korolev
 Senior Women's winner:  Gladys Tejeda
 Senior Men's Team winners: 
 Senior Women's Team winners: 
 March 5 – 8: Athletics CAA Junior African Championships 2015 in  Addis Ababa

  won both the gold and overall medal tallies.
 March 6 – 8: 2015 European Athletics Indoor Championships in  Prague
 
  won the gold medal tally.  won the overall medal tally.
 April 23 – 26: Athletics CAA Youth African Championships 2015 in  Port Louis
  won both the gold and overall medal tallies.
 May 8 – 10: 2015 Oceania Athletics Championships and 2015 Oceania Youth Athletics Championships in  Cairns
 Host nation, won both the gold and overall medal tallies in both competitions.
 May 8 – 11: Athletics AAA Youth Asian Championships 2015 in  Doha
  won both the gold and overall medal tallies.
 June 3 – 7: 2015 Asian Athletics Championships in  Wuhan
 Host nation, won both the gold and overall medal tallies.
 June 12 – 14: 2015 South American Championships in Athletics in  Lima
  won both the gold and overall medal tallies.
 June 20 & 21: 2015 European Team Championships
 Super League in  Cheboksary winner: 
 First League in  Heraklion winner: 
 Second League in  Stara Zagora winner: 
 Third League in  Baku winner: 
 July 4 & 5: 2015 Oceania Half Marathon Championships in  Gold Coast
 Men:  Takehiro Deki
 Women:  Eloise Wellings
 July 16 – 19: 2015 European Athletics Junior Championships in  Eskilstuna
  won the gold medal tally. Great Britain and  won 17 overall medals each.
 July 31 – August 2: 2015 Pan American Junior Athletics Championships in  Edmonton
 The  won both the gold and overall medal tallies.
 August 7 – 9: 2015 NACAC Championships in  San José, Costa Rica
 The  won both the gold and overall medal tallies.
 August 9: 2015 South American Marathon Championships in  Asunción
 Men's winner:  Juan Huaman 
 Women's winner:  Wilma Arizapana
 December 13: 2015 European Cross Country Championships in  Toulon-Hyères
  won both the gold and overall medal tallies.

Seasonal results

World Marathon Majors
 February 22: 2015 Tokyo Marathon
 Winners:  Endeshaw Negesse (m) /  Berhane Dibaba (f)
 April 20: 2015 Boston Marathon
 Winners:  Lelisa Desisa (m) /  Caroline Rotich (f)
 April 26: 2015 London Marathon
 Winners:  Eliud Kipchoge (m) /  Tigist Tufa (f)
 September 27: 2015 Berlin Marathon
 Winners:  Eliud Kipchoge (m) /  Gladys Cherono (f)
 October 11: 2015 Chicago Marathon
 Winners:  Dickson Chumba (m) /  Florence Kiplagat (f)
 November 1: 2015 New York City Marathon
 Winners:  Stanley Biwott (m) /  Mary Jepkosgei Keitany (f)

IAAF Road Race Label Events
 January 3 – December 31: 2015 IAAF Label Road Races Calendar

Gold Label
 January 3:  Xiamen International Marathon
 Winners:  Moses Mosop (m) /  Mare Dibaba (f)
 January 23:  Dubai Marathon
 Winners:  Lemi Berhanu (m) /  Aselefech Mergia (f)
 March 1:  Lake Biwa Marathon (men only)
 Winner:  Samuel Ndungu
 March 1:  Roma-Ostia Half Marathon
 Winners:  Robert Chemosin (m) /  Amane Beriso (f)
 March 1:  World's Best 10K
 Winners:  Sammy Kitwara (m) /  Belaynesh Oljira (f)
 March 8:  Nagoya Marathon (women only)
 Winner:  Eunice Kirwa
 March 15:  Seoul International Marathon
 Winners:  Wilson Loyanae (m) /  Guteni Shone (f)
 March 22:  Rome Marathon 
 Winners:  Abebe Negewo Degefa (m) /  Meseret Kitat Tolwalk (f)
 March 22:  Lisbon Half Marathon
 Winners:  Mo Farah (m) /  Rose Chelimo (f)
 March 28:  Prague Half Marathon
 Winners:  Daniel Wanjiru (m) /  Worknesh Degefa (f)
 April 12:  Rotterdam Marathon
 Winners:  Abera Kuma (m) /  Asami Kato (f)
 April 12:  Paris Marathon
 Winners:  Mark Korir (m) /  Meseret Mengistu (f)
 April 12:  Vienna City Marathon
 Winners:  Sisay Lemma (m) /  Maja Neuenschwander (f)
 April 19:  Yangzhou Jianzhen International Half Marathon
 Winners:  Mosinet Geremew (m) /  Flomena Cheyech Daniel (f)
 May 3:  Prague Marathon
 Winners:  Felix Kandie (m) /  Yebrqual Melese (f)
 May 10:  Great Manchester Run
 Winners:  Stephen Sambu (m) /  Betsy Saina (f)
 May 23:  Ottawa Race Weekend (10 km event)
 Winners:  Nicholas Bor (m) /  Gladys Cherono (f)
 June 20:  Olomouc Half Marathon
 Winners:  Josphat Kiptis (m) /  Mary Jepkosgei Keitany (f)
 July 5:  Gold Coast Marathon
 Winners:  Kenneth Mburu Mungara (m) /  Risa Takenaka (f)
 July 26:  Bogotá Half Marathon
 Winners:  Stanley Biwott (m) /  Amane Gobena (f)
 September 5:  Prague Grand Prix (10 km event)
 Winners:  Daniel Chebii (m) /  Peres Jepchirchir (f)
 September 12:  Ústí nad Labem Half Marathon
 Winners:  Merhawi Kesete (m) /  Peres Jepchirchir (f)
 September 13:  Great North Run
 Winners:  Mo Farah (m) /  Mary Jepkosgei Keitany (f)
 September 20:  Carrera de la Mujer (women only)
 Winner:  Belaynesh Oljira
 September 20:  Sydney Marathon
 Winners:  Hisanori Kitajima (m) /  Meriem Wangari (f)
 September 20:  Beijing Marathon
 Winners:  Mariko Kiplagat Kipchumba (m) /  Betelhem Moges (f)
 October 4:  Great Scottish Run
 Winners:  Moses Ndiema Kipsiro (m) /  Edna Kiplagat (f)
 October 18:  Lisbon Marathon
 Winners:  Asbel Kipsang (m) /  Purity Rionoripo (f)
 October 18:  Lisbon Half Marathon
 Winners:  Nguse Tesfaldet (m) /  Beatrice Mutai (f)
 October 18:  Amsterdam Marathon
 Winners:  Bernard Kipyego (m) /  Joyce Chepkirui (f)
 October 18:  Toronto Waterfront Marathon
 Winners:  Ishimael Chemtan (m) /  Shure Demise (f)
 October 25:  Frankfurt Marathon
 Winners:  Sisay Lemma (m) /  Gulume Tollesa (f)
 October 25:  Great South Run
 Winners:  Moses Ndiema Kipsiro (m) /  Vivian Cheruiyot (f)
 November 8:  Shanghai Marathon
 Winners:  Paul Lonyangata (m) /  Rael Nguriatukei Kiyara (f)
 November 15:  Istanbul Marathon
 Winners:  Elias Chelimo (m) /  Amane Gobena (f)
 December 6:  Fukuoka Marathon (men only)
 Winner:  Patrick Makau Musyoki
 December 6:  Singapore Marathon (final)
 Winners:  Julius Maisei (m) /  Doris Changeywo (f)

Silver Label
 January 25:  Osaka International Ladies Marathon (women only)
 Winner:  Tetyana Hamera-Shmyrko
 January 25:  Hong Kong Marathon
 Winners:  Sentayehu Merga (m) /  Kim Hye-Gyong  (f)
 February 1:  Kagawa Marugame Half Marathon
 Winners:  Paul Kuira (m) /  Eloise Wellings (f)
 February 1:  Beppu-Ōita Marathon (men only)
 Winner:  Tewelde Estifanos
 April 5:  Daegu Marathon
 Winners:  Girmay Birhanu (m) /  Meselech Melkamu (f)
 April 11:  Great Ireland Run
 Winners:  Japhet Korir (m) /  Gemma Steel (f)
 April 19:  Hannover Marathon
 Winners:  Jacob Cheshari (m) /  Souad Ait Salem (f)
 April 19:  Łódź Maraton Dbam o Zdrowie
 Winners:  Albert Kiplagat Matebor (m) /  Monika Stefanowicz (f)
 April 26:  Yellow River Estuary International Marathon
 Winners:  Ernest Ngeno (m) /  Helena Kirop (f)
 April 26:  Warsaw Marathon
 Winners:  Hayle Lemi Berhanu (m) /  Fatuma Sado (f)
 April 26:  Madrid Marathon
 Winners:  Ezekiel Kiptoo Chebii (m) /  Monica Jepkoech (f)
 May 17:  Gifu Seiryu Half Marathon
 Winners:  James Gitahi Rungaru (m) /  Eunice Kirwa
 May 23:  Mattoni Karlovy Vary Half Marathon
 Winners:  Elijah Tirop (m) /  Mulu Seboka (f)
 May 24:  Ottawa Race Weekend (Ottawa Marathon)
 Winners:  Girmay Birhanu (m) /  Aberu Mekuria (f)
 May 30:  Freihofer's Run for Women (women only)
 Winner:  Emily Chebet
 June 6:  České Budějovice Half Marathon
 Winners:  Abraham Cheroben (m) /  Rose Chelimo (f)
 September 20:  Cape Town Marathon
 Winners:  Shadrack Kemboi (m) /  Isabella Ochichi (f)
 September 20:  Dam tot Damloop
 Winners:  Edwin Kiptoo (m) /  Joyce Chepkirui (f)
 October 18:  Medio Maraton Valencia Trinidad Alfonso 2015
 Winners:  Abraham Cheroben (m) /  Netsanet Gudeta (f)
 October 18:  Great Birmingham Run
 Winners:  Chris Thompson (m) /  Dominika Napieraj (f)
 October 25:  Marseille Cassis 20km
 Winners:  Edwin Kipyego (m) /  Peres Jepchirchir (f)
 October 25:  Venice Marathon
 Winners:  Julius Chepkwony (m) /  Ehite Bizuayehu (f)
 November 8:  Beirut Marathon
 Winners:  Jackson Limo (m) /  Kaltoum Bouaasayriya
 November 15:  Saitama Marathon (debut event and women only)
 Winner:  Atsede Baysa
 November 15:  Maraton Valencia Trinidad Alfonso
 Winners:  John Nzau Mwangangi /  Beata Naigambo (f)
 December 27:  Corrida de Houilles
 Winners:  Cornelius Kangogo (m) /  Zerfie Limeneh (f)
 December 31:  San Silvestre Vallecana (final)
 Winners:  Sergio Salinero (m) /  Clara Viñaras (f)

Bronze Label
 January 18:  Houston Marathon
 Winners:  Birhanu Gidefa (m) /  Yebrqual Melese (f)
 February 22:  Maraton Ciudad de Sevilla
 Winners:  Lawrence Cherono (m) /  Filomena Costa (f)
 March 22:  New Taipei City Wan Jin Shi Marathon
 Winners:  Eliud Barngetuny (m) /  Gladys Kipsoi (f)
 April 12:  Milano City Marathon
 Winners:  Evergreen Kenneth Mungara (m) /  Lucy Karimi (f)
 April 12:  Brighton Marathon
 Winners:  Duncan Maiyo (m) /  Pennina Wanjiru (f)
 April 12:  Santiago Marathon
 Winners:  Luka Rotich Lobuwan (m) /  Inés Melchor (f)
 April 19:  Nagano Olympic Commemorative Marathon
 Winners:  Henry Chirchir (m) /  Beatrice Toroitich (f)
 May 16:  Okpekpe 10 km Road Race
 Winners:  Alex Oloitiptip Korio (m) /  Angela Tanui (f)
 May 17:  Riga Marathon
 Winners:  Haile Tolossa (m) /  Meseret Eshetu (f)
 May 31:  Edinburgh Marathon
 Winners:  Peter Wanjiru (m) /  Joan Kigen (f)
 June 13:  Corrida de Langueux
 Winners:  Simon Cheprot (m) /  Gladys Yator (f)
 September 13:  Copenhagen Marathon (half marathon only)
 Winners:  Bedan Karoki (m) /  Purity Rionoripo (f)
 September 20:  Siberian International Marathon
 Winners:  Laban Moiben (m) /  Albina Mayorova (f)
 October 4:  Bournemouth Marathon
 Winners:  Boaz Kiprono (m) /  Joan Kigen (f)
 October 11:  20 Kilomètres de Paris
 Winners:  Stephen Ogari (m) /  Nancy Kimaiyo (f)
 November 8:  French Riviera Marathon
 Winners:  Barnabas Kiptum (m) /  Rose Jepchumba (f) 
 November 15:  Boulogne-Billancourt Half Marathon
 Event cancelled, due to the November 2015 Paris attacks on November 13.
 November 29:  Marathon du Gabon (final)
 Winners:  Korio Alex Olotptip (m) /  Tanui Anfele (f)

IAAF Diamond League
 May 15 – September 11: 2015 IAAF Diamond League Schedule
 May 15: Qatar Athletic Super Grand Prix in  Doha
 The  won both the gold and overall medal tallies.
 May 17: Shanghai Golden Grand Prix in 
  won both the gold and overall medal tallies.
 May 30: Prefontaine Classic in  Eugene, Oregon
 June 4: Golden Gala in  Rome
 The  won both the gold and overall medal tallies.
 June 7: British Grand Prix in  Birmingham
  won the gold medal tally. The  won the overall medal tally.
 June 11: Bislett Games in  Oslo
  and  won 2 gold medals each. The  won the overall medal tally.
 June 13: Adidas Grand Prix in  New York City
 July 4: Meeting Areva in  Saint-Denis (Paris)
  won the gold medal tally. The  won the overall medal tally.
 July 9: Athletissima in  Lausanne
 The  won both the gold and overall medal tallies.
 July 17: Herculis in  Fontvieille
 The  won both the gold and overall medal tallies.
 July 24 & 25: London Grand Prix in 
 The  won both the gold and overall medal tallies.
 July 30: DN Galan in  Stockholm
 The  won both the gold and overall medal tallies.
 September 3: Weltklasse Zürich in 
  won the gold medal tally. The  won the overall medal tally.
 September 11: Memorial Van Damme in  Brussels (final)
 The  won both the gold and overall medal tallies.

IAAF Cross Country Permit
 November 16, 2014 – March 14, 2015: 2015 IAAF Cross Country Permit Schedule
 November 16, 2014: Cross de Atapuerca in  Burgos
 Winners:  Imane Merga (m) /  Belaynesh Oljira (f)
 December 21, 2014: Lotto Cross Cup Brussels in 
 Winners:  Alex Kibet (m) /  Sheila Chepngetich Keter (f)
 January 6: 58th Campaccio-International Cross Country in  San Giorgio su Legnano
 Winners:  Dathan Ritzenhein (m) /  Janet Kisa (f)
 January 10: Great Edinburgh International Cross Country in 
 Men's 4 km winner:  Garrett Heath
 Men's 8 km winner:  Chris Derrick
 Women's 6 km winner:  Emelia Gorecka
 January 18: Cross Internacional de Itálica in  Seville
 Winners:  Teklemariam Medhin (m) /  Emily Chebet (f)
 January 25: Cross Internacional Juan Muguerza in  Elgoibar
 Winners:  Teklemariam Medhin (m) /  Mimi Belete (f)
 February 8: Chiba International Cross Country in 
 Men's 12 km winner:  Charles Ndirangu
 Women's 8 km winner:  Zoe Buckman 
 Junior men's 8 km winner:  Ryoji Tatezawa
 Junior women's 5 km winner:  Wakana Kabasawa
 February 14: IAAF Permit/Athletics Kenya Cross Country in  Nairobi
Senior Men 12 km winner:  Bedan Karoki
Senior Women 8 km winner:  Faith Chepngetich Kipyegon
Junior Men 8 km winner:  Dominic Kiptarus
Junior Women 6 km winner:  Rosefline Chepngetich
 February 15: Cinque Mulini in  San Vittore Olona
 Winners:  Muktar Edris (m) /  Violet Jelagat (f)
 February 22: Almond Blossom Cross Country in  Albufeira
 Winners:  Roman Prodius (m) /  Dominika Nowakowska (f)
 Winners:  Thomas Ayeko (m) /  Birtukan Fente Alemu (f)

IAAF Indoor Permit
 January 31 – February 21: 2015 IAAF Indoor Permit Schedule
 January 31: Weltklasse in Karlsruhe in 
  and the  won 2 gold medals each.  and the United States won 5 overall medals each.
 February 1: Russian Winter Meeting in  Moscow
 Host nation, won both the gold and overall medal tallies.
 February 7: New Balance Indoor Grand Prix in  Boston
 February 19: XL Galan in  Stockholm
 Host nation, won both the gold and overall medal tallies.

 Host nation, won both the gold and overall medal tallies.

IAAF Race Walking Challenge
 February 22 – August 30: 2015 IAAF Race Walking Challenge Schedule
 February 22: Oceania Race Walking Championships in  Adelaide
 Winners:  Jared Tallent (m) /  Tanya Holliday (f)
 March 7: Circuito Internacional de Marcha Chihuahua 2015 in 
 Men's 20 km winner:  Eder Sánchez
 Women's 20 km winner:  María Guadalupe González Romero
 Men's 50 km winner:  José Leyver Ojeda
 March 15: Asian Race Walking Championships in  Nomi, Ishikawa
 Winners:  Yusuke Suzuki (m) (World Record) /  HOU Yangbao (f)
 March 21: Dudinska Paldesjatka in  Dudince
 Men's 20 km winner:  Lebogang Shange
 Women's 20 km winner:  Eleonora Anna Giorgi
 Men's 50 km winner:  Matej Tóth
 April 18: 24th Grande Prémio Internacional de Rio Maior em Marcha Atlética in 
 Winners:  Eider Arévalo (m) /  Liu Hong (f)
 May 1: 2015 IAAF Race Walking Challenge in  Taicang
 Winners:  Chen Ding (m) /  DUAN Dandan (f)
 May 9 & 10: 2015 Pan American Race Walking Cup in  Arica

  won the gold medal tally.  won the overall medal tally.
 May 17: 2015 European Race Walking Cup in  Murcia

  won both the gold and overall medal tallies.
 June 6: 29th Gran Premio Cantones de La Coruña in 
 Winners:  Wang Zhen (m) (Meet Record) /  Liu Hong (f) (World Record)
 August 22 – 30: Part of the 2015 World Championships in Athletics in Beijing (final)
 Men's 20 km winner:  Miguel Ángel López
 Women's 20 km winner:  Liu Hong
 Men's 50 km winner:  Matej Tóth

IAAF Combined Events Challenge
 May 8 – September 20: 2015 IAAF Combined Events Challenge Schedule
 May 8 – 10: Oceania Combined Events Championships in  Cairns
 Men's Decathlon winner:  Brent Newdick (7,140 points)
 Women's Heptathlon winner:  Sarah Wood (5,052 points)
 May 15 & 16: Multistars - Trofeo Zerneri Acciai in  Florence
 Men's Decathlon winner:  Pawel Wiesiolek (7,863 points)
 Women's Heptathlon winner:  Sofia Yfantidou (5,900 points)
 May 30 & 31: Hypo-Meeting in  Götzis
 Men's Decathlon winner:  Kai Kazmirek (8,462 points)
 Women's Heptathlon winner:  Brianne Theisen-Eaton (6,808 points)
 June 12 & 13: TNT – Fortuna Meeting in  Kladno
 Men's Decathlon winner:  Marek Lukas (7,892 points)
 Women's Heptathlon winner:  Hanna Kasyanova (6,277 points)
 June 19 & 20: Combined Events Capital Cup in  Ottawa
 Men's Decathlon winner:  Yordanis García (7,977 points)
 Women's Heptathlon winner:  Yorgelis Rodríguez (6,068 points)
 June 25 – 28: 2015 USA Outdoor Track and Field Championships in  Eugene, Oregon
 Men's Decathlon winner:  Trey Hardee (8,725 points)
 Women's Heptathlon winner:  Barbara Nwaba (6,500 points)
 June 27 & 28: Mehrkampf-Meeting Ratingen in 
 Men's Decathlon winner:  Michael Schrader (8,419 points)
 Women's Heptathlon winner:  Anouk Vetter (6,387 points)
 July 4 & 5: European Combined Events Cup Super League in  Aubagne
 Men's Decathlon winner:  Ilya Shkurenyov (8,378 points)
 Women's Heptathlon winner:  Alina Fyodorova (6,278 points)
 July 4 & 5: European Combined Events Cup First League and Second League in  Inowrocław
 First League Men's Decathlon winner:  Martin Roe (7,875 points)
 First League Women's Heptathlon winner:  Karolina Tymińska (6,174 points)
 Second League Men's Decathlon winner:  Joli Koivu (7,462 points)
 Second League Women's Heptathlon winner:  Laura Ikauniece-Admidiņa (6,470 points)
 July 8 – 12: Part of the 2015 Summer Universiade in  Gwangju
 Men's Decathlon winner:  Thomas van der Plaetsen (7,952 points)
 Women's Heptathlon winner:  Anna Maiwald (6,111 points)
 July 18 – 26: Part of the 2015 Pan American Games in  Toronto
 Men's Decathlon winner:  Damian Warner (8,659 points)
 Women's Heptathlon winner:  Yorgelis Rodríguez (6,332 points)
 August 22 – 30: Part of the 2015 World Championships in Athletics in  Beijing
 Men's Decathlon winner:  Ashton Eaton (9,045 points) World Record
 Women's Heptathlon winner:  Jessica Ennis-Hill (6,669 points)
 September 19 & 20: Décastar in  Talence (final)
 Men's Decathlon winner:  Willem Coertzen (8,187 points)
 Women's Heptathlon winner:  Györgyi Zsivoczky-Farkas (6,306 points)

IAAF World Challenge
 March 21 – September 13: 2015 IAAF World Challenge Schedule
 March 21: Melbourne Track Classic in 
 Host nation, won both the gold and overall medal tallies.
 May 9: Jamaica International Invitational in  Kingston
 The  won both the gold and overall medal tallies.
 May 10: Golden Grand Prix in  Kawasaki
The United States won the overall medal tally.
 May 20: IAAF World Challenge Beijing in 
 Host nation, and the  won 3 gold medals each. The United States won the overall medal tally. 
 May 23: Meeting Grand Prix IAAF de Dakar in 
 ,  and the  won 2 gold medals each. Nigeria, the United States, and  won 4 overall medals each.
 May 24: Fanny Blankers-Koen Games in  Hengelo
 May 26: Golden Spike Ostrava in the 
  won the gold medal tally.
 June 14: Meeting International Mohammed VI d'Athlétisme de Rabat in 
  won the gold medal tally.  won the overall medal tally.
 July 11: Meeting de Atletismo Madrid in 
  and the  won 2 gold medals each. The United States won the overall medal tally.
 September 6: ISTAF Berlin in 
The United States won the overall medal tally.
 September 8: Hanžeković Memorial in  Zagreb
 The  won the gold medal tally. The United States, and  won 5 overall medals each.
  won the gold medal tally.  won the overall medal tally.

IAAF Hammer Throw Challenge
 March 21 – September 13: 2015 IAAF Hammer Throw Challenge Calendar
 March 21: Part of the Melbourne Track Classic in 
 Winner:  Matthew Denny
 May 10: Part of the Golden Grand Prix in  Kawasaki
 Winner:  Martina Hrašnová
 May 20: Part of the IAAF World Challenge Beijing in 
 Winner:  Anita Włodarczyk
 May 23: Part of the IAAF World Challenge Dakar in 
 Winner:  Gwen Berry
 May 26: Part of the Golden Spike Ostrava in the 
 Men's winner:  Paweł Fajdek
 Women's winner:  Anita Włodarczyk
 June 14: Part of the Meeting International Mohammed VI d'Athlétisme de Rabat in 
 Winner:  Paweł Fajdek
 June 25: Paavo Nurmi Games in  Turku
 Winner:  Paweł Fajdek
 July 7: István Gyulai Memorial in  Székesfehérvár
 Winner:  Paweł Fajdek
 July 18: Brothers Znamensky Memorial in  Moscow
 Men's winner:  Dilshod Nazarov
 Women's winner:  Mariya Bespalova
 July 22: Karlstad Grand Prix in 
 Winner:  Dilshod Nazarov
 August 9: Janusz Kusociński Memorial in  Szczecin
 Men's winner:  Paweł Fajdek
 Women's winner:  Anita Włodarczyk
 August 22 – 30: Part of the 2015 World Championships in Athletics in  Beijing
 Men's winner:  Paweł Fajdek
 Women's winner:  Anita Włodarczyk
 September 6: Part of the ISTAF Berlin in 
 Winner:  Kathrin Klaas
 Winner:  Paweł Fajdek

IPC Athletics Grand Prix
 February 22 – July 26: 2015 IPC Athletics Grand Prix
 February 22 – 25: 7th Fazaa International Athletics Competition in  Dubai
 For results, click here. After that, go to Meeting Dubai section and click the results day 1 to results day 4.
 March 6 – 8: 2015 Queensland State Championships in  Brisbane
 For results, click here.
 March 23 – 25: 9th Tunis International Meeting in  Tunis
 For Day 1 results, click here.
 For Day 2 results, click here.
 For Day 3 results, click here.
 Host nation, and  won 28 gold medals each. Algeria won the overall medal tally.
 April 18 – 20: 3rd China Open Athletics Championships in  Beijing
 For results, click here.
 May 13 – 17: 2015 Desert Challenge Games in  Mesa, Arizona
 For results, click here.
 May 29 – 31: 2015 ParAthletics in  Nottwil
 For results, click here.
 June 12 – 14: 2015 Italian Open Championships in  Grosseto
 For results, click here.
 June 19 – 21: 2015 Berlin Open in 
 For complete results, click here.
 For day to day results, click here.
 July 26: 2015 IPC Athletics Grand Prix Final in  London
 For results, click here.

References

Notes

External links
 IAAF Official Website

Athletics (track and field) by year